Sinocrassula is a genus of succulent, subtropical plants of the family Crassulaceae.

The name "Sinocrassula" means "Chinese crassula". They come from the province Yunnan in the south of China, and also from the north of Burma. They grow at an altitude between 2,500 and 2,700 m.

Species 
 Sinocrassula ambigua (Praeger) A. Berger
 Sinocrassula bergeri H.Jacobsen
 Sinocrassula densirosulata (Praeger) A. Berger
 Sinocrassula diversifolia H. Chuang
 Sinocrassula indica (Decne.) A. Berger
 Sinocrassula indica var. forrestii (Raym.-Hamet) S.H. Fu
 Sinocrassula indica var. luteorubra (Praeger) S.H. Fu
 Sinocrassula indica var. obtusifolia (Fröd.) S.H. Fu
 Sinocrassula indica var. serrata (Raym.-Hamet) S.H. Fu
 Sinocrassula longistyla (Praeger) S.H. Fu
 Sinocrassula luteorubra (Praeger) H.Chuang
 Sinocrassula techinensis (S.H. Fu) S.H. Fu
 Sinocrassula vietnamensis (S.H. Fu) S.H. Fu
 Sinocrassula yunnanensis Aver. et V. Byalt

Description 
Sinocrassula presents rosettes of thin fleshy triangular brown leaves. The plants are up to 20 cm height.

They develop dense clumps. Sometimes, Sinocrassula shows monstrous forms.

The inflorescence is a dense panicle up to 10–15 cm with whitish flowers and red-tipped petals.

Cultivation 
They need a well-drained soil, a sunny or lightly shaded exposure. They tolerate a more shaded location but grow less. They require moderate watering, with very little in winter. In a temperate climate, plants can be outside.

Division of plants and pruning are the easiest ways of multiplication. Seeding is also possible.

References

External links 

  Sinocrassula photos on www.AIAPS.org

Crassulaceae
Succulent plants
Crassulaceae genera
Taxa named by Alwin Berger